Erizados, also known as Two Rising Up, is a 2006 welded steel sculpture by Maritza Vazquez, installed along Puerto Vallarta's Malecón, in the Mexican state of Jalisco. The work depicts two sea urchins, and was originally constructed from a thinner material which was unable to withstand the elements.

See also

 2006 in art

References

External links
 

2006 establishments in Mexico
2006 sculptures
Centro, Puerto Vallarta
Outdoor sculptures in Puerto Vallarta
Steel sculptures in Mexico